Yuma is a 2012 Polish-Czech action film directed by Piotr Mularuk.

Cast 
 Jakub Gierszał - Zyga
 Krzysztof Skonieczny - Kula (Bullet)
 Jakub Kamieński - Młot (Hammer)
 Tomasz Kot - Opat (Abbot)
 Katarzyna Figura - Halinka
  - Majka
Helena Sujecka − Bajadera
Malwina Wasilewska − Klara
Jerzy Schejbal − Zyga's father
Aldona Struzik − Zyga's mother
Kazimierz Mazur − Rysio
Tomasz Schuchardt − Ernest
Zbigniew Stryj − Shopkeeper in Frankfuhrt
Przemysław Bluszcz − Mayor

References

External links 

2012 action films
Polish action films
Czech action films